The Roman Catholic Diocese of Brentwood is a diocese of the Latin Church of the Roman Catholic church in England. The diocese is a suffragan of the Archdiocese of Westminster.

Overview
The diocese covers the traditional county of Essex, an area of 3,959 km2 comprising the non-metropolitan County of Essex, the unitary authorities of Southend-on-Sea and Thurrock, and the London boroughs of Barking & Dagenham, Havering, Newham, Redbridge and Waltham Forest, matching Essex's historic boundaries and the Anglican Diocese of Chelmsford.  The see is in the town of Brentwood where the seat is located at the Cathedral Church of Saint Mary and Saint Helen.
It has 82 parishes, among these 47 parishes are in London; Havering (11), Barking and Dagenham (6), Redbridge (11), Waltham Forest (8), Newham (11).

History
The diocese was erected on 20 July 1917 from the Archdiocese of Westminster.  The current bishop is Alan Williams, the seventh Bishop of Brentwood.

Bishops

Past and Present Ordinaries

 Bernard Nicholas Ward (appointed on 20 July 1917 – died in office on 21 January 1920) 
 Arthur Doubleday (appointed on 7 May 1920 – died in office on 23 January 1951) 
 George Andrew Beck, A.A. (succeeded on 23 January 1951 – translated to the Diocese of Salford on 28 November 1955) 
 Bernard Patrick Wall (appointed on 30 November 1955 – retired on 14 April 1969) 
 Patrick Joseph Casey (appointed on 2 December 1969 – resigned on 12 December 1979) 
 Thomas McMahon (appointed on 16 June 1980 – resigned on 14 April 2014)
 Alan Williams (current ordinary, appointed on 14 April 2014)

Coadjutor Bishops
George Andrew Beck, A.A. (1948-1951)

Other priests of this diocese who became bishops
Hugh Christopher Budd, appointed Bishop of Plymouth in 1985
Brian Charles Foley, appointed Bishop of Lancaster in 1962
John Carmel Heenan, appointed Bishop of Leeds in 1951; future Cardinal
John Edward Petit, appointed Bishop of Menevia, Wales in 1947

See also
 Catholic Church in England and Wales
 List of Catholic churches in the United Kingdom

External links 
Diocese of Brentwood website

 
Christian organizations established in 1917
Roman Catholic dioceses and prelatures established in the 20th century
Brentwood